Branstetter is a surname. Notable people with the surname include:

Jennifer Branstetter, American Secretary of Planning and Policy of Pennsylvania
Kent Branstetter (born 1949), American football player
Lance Branstetter, American guitarist who was part of Mutha's Day Out
Olin Branstetter (1929–2011), American businessman and politician
Otto Branstetter (1877–1924), American socialist

See also
Brandstätter
Brandstetter
Branstetter Rocks, a rock formation of Princess Elizabeth Land, Antarctica
Jane Branstetter Stranch (born 1953), United States Circuit Judge
Site of Ferdinand Branstetter Post No. 1, American Legion